Cast Iron Filter is a band based in Davidson, North Carolina. Their genre is similar to that of Progressive Bluegrass, but Cast Iron Filter's fans call it "Irongrass". The band had been praised for its instrumental finesse and has been related to a Jamband that knows when to stop; they could even be considered a hayseed Nickel Creek.
The band members include, Brian Burton (Drummer), Dustin Edge (Lead Singer and Guitar Player), Mike Orlando (Mandolin/Banjo Player) and Phil Skipper (Bass Player).  Former members include Tim Helfrich (drums), Mason Bissett (bass), Jim Ashton (steel guitar), Howie Cockrill (fiddle/bass), and Randy Culbertson (Guitar).

Cast Iron Filter's last official show was played at The Visulite Theatre in Charlotte, NC on December 31, 2004. Tim Helfrich and Dustin Edge have put on shows as recently as 2011, featuring performances by the major lineups from past Cast Iron Filter incarnations. The band played one reunion show on Jan 16, 2010.

Michael Orlando released 2 records "Wreckless" and "Before the Storm".

Dustin Edge has released 1 full-length LP (A Forest Through the Trees, 2008) and 1 EP (By The Numbers, 2010). A new 5-song EP, Calm, was released in January 2011.

Albums 

Paradise in Palestine (August 1999)
Further Down the Line (September 2000)
This Ugly Town    (October 2001)
Live From the Highway (October 2002)
Falls of Rough  (August 2004)

References

External links 
 Official website for Cast Iron Filter

American bluegrass music groups